Eclipsiodes crypsixantha is a moth in the family Crambidae. It was described by Edward Meyrick in 1884. It is found in Australia, where it has been recorded from New South Wales and South Australia.

References

Moths described in 1884
Heliothelini
Taxa named by Edward Meyrick